Georgios Parakeimenos was a physician and preacher. He was born in Kozani and later he studied medicine and philosophy at Padua. He was director of the Kozani school from 1694 to 1707.

References

External links 
 List of Macedonians (Greek)
 List of Great Macedonians (15th-19th century)

17th-century births
18th-century deaths
People from Kozani
Greek Macedonians
Greek educational theorists
Macedonia under the Ottoman Empire
18th-century Greek educators
17th-century Greek educators
17th-century Greek physicians
18th-century Greek physicians